Mila Miletic (Serbian: Mila Miletić / Мила Милетић, born 5 August 1991 in Jagodina) is a Serbian fashion model. 
Scouted by Jelena Ivanovic of Model Scouting Office, she began her career in 2012 after signing with Women Management Worldwide. 
She appeared on the cover of Elle magazine, Serbia (June 2012) and Blackbook (February 2013).
 
Featured in:
 Grazia (France)
 Grazia (Serbia)
 W
 Vs.
 Sleek
 Interview (Russia)
 10 Magazine

References

Lepota i Zdravlje article
Mila Miletic on models.com
Mila Miletic on fashionspot

Serbian female models
People from Jagodina
1991 births
Living people